Trina is a common female first name of Scandinavian origin. The name is based on the Latin word for "triple", Trena, and is occasionally used in reference to the Trinity.

Trina is often used as a shortened version of names such as Katrina.

In dance, it is used as a term referring to a ballerina in training.

People named Trina
 Trina (rapper), an American rap artist, born Katrina Taylor
 Trina Belamide, a Filipino songwriter and record producer
 Trina Braxton, an American singer, actress and reality television personality
 Trina Broussard, an R&B singer and songwriter
 Trina Davis, an American-born Fijian women's footballer
 Trina Gulliver, a female darts player, and ten-time ladies' world champion
 Trina Hamlin, an American folk-rock singer-songwriter
 Trina Hosmer (born 1945), American cross-country skier
 Trina Jackson, an American freestyle swimmer who won an olympic gold medal
 Trina Jeffrie, an American comedian and actress
 Trina McGee, an American actress
 Trina McQueen, a Canadian journalist and broadcasting executive
 Trina Medina, a Venezuelan Salsa and Son singer, songwriter and music arranger
 Trina Nishimura, an American voice actress working with Funimation
 Trina Papisten, a Polish alleged witch
 Trina Parks, an American actress, vocalist, choreographer, principal dancer and dance instructor
 Trina Pratt, an American former competitive ice dancer
 Trina Radke, an American former competitive swimmer 
 Trina Roache, a Mi'kmaq video journalist,
 Trina Robbins, an American cartoonist. 
 Trina Schart Hyman, an American illustrator
 Trina Shoemaker, a mixer, record producer and sound engineer 
 Trina Vargo, the founder and President of the US-Ireland Alliance
 Triinu Kivilaan, an Estonian vocalist and former model, previously a member of the band Vanilla Ninja
 Trina Saha, an actress based in India.

Fictional
Trina Echolls, a fictional recurring character portrayed by Alyson Hannigan, on the television series Veronica Mars
Trina Vega, played by Daniella Monet in the Nickelodeon show Victorious
Trina, played by Terra Vnesa in the Canadian drama Degrassi: The Next Generation
Trina Riffin, a fictional character from Grojband
Trina, a recurring antagonist from Big Hero 6: The Series voiced by Christy Carlson Romano
Trina (Taylor), a fictional long-distance swimmer played by Melora Walters in the 1994 comedy Cabin Boy

See also
Treena Livingston Arinzeh (born 1970), American academic
Treena Lahey, a character from Trailer Park Boys

References

Feminine given names